Uruguay is scheduled to compete at the 2023 Pan American Games in Santiago, Chile from October 20 to November 5, 2023. This will be Uruguay's 19th appearance at the Pan American Games, having competed at every edition of the Games.

Competitors
The following is the list of number of competitors (per gender) participating at the games per sport/discipline.

Artistic swimming

Uruguay qualified a team of two artistic swimmers at the 2022 South American Games.

Boxing

Uruguay qualified two boxers (one man and one woman) by reaching the final of the 2022 South American Games.

Men

Women

Canoeing

Sprint
Uruguai qualified a total of 3 sprint athletes (three men).

Men

Equestrian

Uruguay qualified a team of 10 equestrians (two in Dressage, four in Eventing and four in Jumping).

Dressage

Eventing

Jumping

Field hockey

Women's tournament

Uruguay qualified a women's team of 16 athletes by finishing fifth at the 2022 Pan American Cup.

Summary

Football

Men's tournament

Uruguay qualified a men's team of 18 athletes by virtue of its campaign in the 2023 South American U-20 Championship.

Summary

Handball

Men's tournament

Uruguay qualified a men's team (of 14 athletes) by finishing as the second best team not yet qualified in the 2022 South American Games.

Summary

Karate

Uruguay qualified a team of 2 male karatekas at the 2022 South American Games.

Kumite

Modern pentathlon

Uruguay qualified two modern pentathletes (one man and one woman).

Roller sports

Figure
Uruguay qualified a female athlete in figure skating.

Rugby sevens

Men's tournament

Uruguay qualified a men's team (of 12 athletes) after finishing third at the 2022 South American Games.

Summary

Sailing

Uruguay has qualified 2 boats for a total of 3 sailors.

Men

Women

Shooting

Uruguay qualified a total of one shooter after the 2022 Americas Shooting Championships.

Men
Shotgun

References

Nations at the 2023 Pan American Games
2023